The 2021 Engie Open Nantes Atlantique was a professional women's tennis tournament played on indoor hard courts. It was the seventeenth edition of the tournament which was part of the 2021 ITF Women's World Tennis Tour. It took place in Nantes, France between 1 and 7 November 2021.

Singles main-draw entrants

Seeds

 1 Rankings are as of 25 October 2021.

Other entrants
The following players received wildcards into the singles main draw:
  Audrey Albié
  Carole Monnet
  Mallaurie Noël
  Alice Robbe

The following player received entry using a protected ranking:
  Karman Thandi

The following player received entry as a special exempt:
  Simona Waltert

The following players received entry from the qualifying draw:
  Erika Andreeva
  Emina Bektas
  Sara Cakarevic
  Sarah Beth Grey
  Sada Nahimana
  İpek Soylu
  Raluca Șerban
  Daniela Vismane

The following players received entry as lucky losers:
  Diāna Marcinkēviča
  Ekaterina Yashina

Champions

Singles

  Anhelina Kalinina def.  Océane Dodin, 7–6(7–4), 1–0, ret.

Doubles

  Samantha Murray Sharan /  Jessika Ponchet def.  Alicia Barnett /  Olivia Nicholls, 6–4, 6–2

References

External links
 2021 Engie Open Nantes Atlantique at ITFtennis.com
 Official website

2021 ITF Women's World Tennis Tour
2021 in French tennis
November 2021 sports events in France